Amphidromus schomburgki is a species of air-breathing land snail, a terrestrial pulmonate gastropod mollusk in the family Camaenidae.

Subspecies 
 Amphidromus schomburgki dextrochlorus Sutcharit & Panha, 2006
 Amphidromus schomburgki schomburgki (Pfeiffer, 1860)

References

 Haas, F. (1934). Neue Landschnecken des Senckenberg-Museums. Senckenbergiana. 16 (2/3): 94-98.
 Thach N.N. (2016). Vietnamese new mollusks. Seashells – Land snails – Cephalopods. With 59 new species. Published by the author. 205 pp.

External links 
 Pfeiffer L. (1860). Description of thirty-six new species of land shells from Mr. H. Cuming's Collection. Proceedings of the Zoological Society of London. 28: 133–141, pls 50–51
 Pfeiffer L. (1862). Diagnoses de neuf espèces nouvelles provenant de Siam. Journal de Conchyliologie. 10(1): 39-46
 Möllendorff, O. F. von. (1902). Binnenmollusken aus Hinterindien. Nachrichtsblatt der Deutschen Malakozoologischen Gesellschaft. 34(9-10): 153-162
 Sutcharit, C.; Panha, S. (2006). Taxonomic review of the tree snail Amphidromus Albers, 1850 (Pulmonata: Camaenidae) in Thailand and adjacent areas: Subgenus Amphidromus. Journal of Molluscan Studies. 72(1): 1-30

schomburgki
Gastropods described in 1860